Thomas Jackson (1807–1890) was a 19th-century Irish architect who contributed to the iconic baroque look of Belfast. He was described as being the foremost Belfast architect of his day.

Early life
Thomas Jackson was born in the city of Waterford, Ireland, in 1807. His parents were Anthony Jackson and Elizabeth Pim, both practising Quakers. In fact, Thomas Jackson's great-great-great Grandfather was in attendance during the very first Irish Quaker meeting of 1654. Thomas Jackson would later contribute to the local Quaker movement by designing many of the Friends meeting houses in Northern Ireland.

Jackson married Lydia Newsom Ridgeway, another member of the Waterford Quaker community, on New Year's Day 1835. Together they produced two children; Anthony Thomas Jackson and William Ridgeway Jackson.

Career
Thomas Jackson served his early apprenticeship with George Dymond of Bristol, England. In 1829, he moved to Ulster to work in partnership with Thomas Duff of Newry. He was in charge of Duff's newly established Belfast branch office. He kept this role until 1835 before striking out on his own. Thomas's most recognised work from this period was the Old Museum building for the Belfast Natural History and Philosophical Socitety, of which he was an Honorary member.

Around 1840 Jackson returned briefly to Waterford, the city of his birth, to design a new bank at 31 O'Connell Street. The bank was completed in around 1845 (It is due to open as the Waterford Gallery of Art in April 2020).

Around 1867, Thomas Jackson's sons joined him, operating under the name Thomas Jackson & Sons. Anthony left to pursue his own interests circa 1870. William stayed on for roughly another ten years before emigrating to Australia. Thomas Jackson produced very little architectural work in the years following Williams departure.

Jackson was fundamentally a residential architect, but over the course of his career he turned his hand to commercial, educational, industrial and ecclesiastical buildings. An example of his domestic work would be the ambitious Cliftonville development. He was the principal architect of Ulster Bank and of the Banbridge, Lisburn & Belfast Junction Railway.

Notable works
Thomas Jackson was personally credited with 114 designs in total. The following are good examples of work by Thomas Jackson and his sons:

 Arnotts Warehouse, Belfast
 Belfast Hospital for Sick Children
 Clifton Villas, Belfast
 Craigavon House
 Glenmachon House, Belfast
 Graymount House, Belfast
 Natural History Museum, Belfast
  St. George's Building, Belfast
 St. Malachy's Church, Belfast
 31 O'Connell Street, Waterford

Gallery

Portfolio
NB: Some omissions due to lack of descriptive information.

References

Bibliography
 James Stevens Curl, 'A Dictionary of Architecture and Landscape Architecture'. 
 Hugh Dixon, 'Honouring Thomas Jackson (1807–1890)'. British Natural History and Philosophical Society Journal.
 Paul Larmour, 'A hive of activity (Thomas Jackson 1807–1890)'. QUB Perspective Journal.

1807 births
1890 deaths
People from Waterford (city)
Architects from Belfast
Irish architects
19th-century architects